USS Golet (SS-361), a Gato-class submarine, was the only ship of the United States Navy to be named for the golet, a California trout.

Construction and commissioning
Thus, in some references, these four submarines are listed as units of the Balao-class.

War bond purchases by the people of Shreveport, Louisiana, and Cadddo Parish, Louisiana, funded Golet′s construction. Her keel was laid down by the Manitowoc Shipbuilding Company of Manitowoc, Wisconsin. She was launched on 1 August 1943 sponsored by Mrs. Wiley, wife of United States Senator Alexander Wiley of Wisconsin, and commissioned on 30 November 1943.

Operational history

Golet departed Manitowoc 19 December 1943 via the Mississippi River for New Orleans, Louisiana, arriving 28 December. After shakedown training at Panama and final battle practice in Hawaiian waters Golet departed Pearl Harbor on 18 March 1944 for her maiden war patrol.

First Patrol:  18 March 1944 
Golet departed Pearl Harbor on 18 March 1944 for her maiden war patrol off the Kurile Islands chain, Southern Hokkaidō and Eastern Honshū, Japan. Severe combinations of fog, rain, and ice were encountered and only one ship worth a torpedo came into view. This enemy proved too fast for Golet to close to torpedo range; she returned to Midway Island on 3 May 1944.

Second Patrol: 28 May 1944 
Lieutenant Commander James S. Clark took command of Golet, departed Midway Island on 28 May 1944 to patrol off northern Honshū, Japan, and was never heard from again.

Golet had been scheduled to depart her area on 5 July and was expected at Midway Island about 12 July or 13 July. She failed to acknowledge a message sent her on 9 July and was presumed lost 26 July 1944.

Fate: 14 June 1944 
Japanese antisubmarine records available after the war revealed that Golet was the probable victim of a Japanese antisubmarine attack made 14 June 1944. These records mention that the attack brought up cork, rafts, and other debris and a heavy pool of oil, all evidence of the sinking of a submarine.

Commemoration

Commissioning Crew: 30 November 1943 

A plaque at the Wisconsin Maritime Museum in Manitowoc, Wisconsin, lists the members of Golet′s commissioning crew on 30 November 1943 and provides a brief history of Golet′s career.

Memorial: 9 March 2013
A memorial to Golet and her crew is located in Metairie, Louisiana. Its inscription reads:

<blockquote>U.S.S. Golet SS-361 A submarine built by Manitowoc shipbuilding Co of Manitowoc, Wisconsin. Funds for this boat were raised by the citizens of Caddo Parish Louisiana. Launched one August 1943, her second patrol under the command of LCDR. James S. Clark was sunk by enemy depth charges on 14 June 1944. All hands were lost – 82 men.  May God rest their souls.<blockquote>

The memorial also lists her crew at the time of her sinking, all of whom were lost, as follows:

 George Robert Barlow
 Elwin Charles Barnes
 Richard Andrew Barta
 Edward Ludwig Bartz
 Donald William Beaulieu
 Donald Lee Belcher
 Carl McCasland Bickham
 Edward Richard Blackburn
 John Wilson Breunig
 John Warren Brown
 Joseph Alfred Butor
 Allan Harold Carr
 James Seerley Clark, C.O.
 William Melvin Coram
 Robert Raymond Danko
 Walter Dearl Davidson
 Clifton Dowey
 Vinton Jordan Earle
 Willard Archie Edwards
 LeRoy Leo Germann
 Herbert C. Goetz
 George Leonard Gormley
 Joseph Frederick Greenhalgh
 Stanley Erwin Grumet
 Oliver Clark Guest, Jr.
 Robert Edward Hanley
 Robert Edwin Hardy
 Raymond Lavern Harville
 George Donald Hendley
 Robert Edward Hoffman
 Elmer James Hughes
 Jack Junior Humble
 Robert William Infalt
 Clarence Herman Johnson
 Walter Maurice Kane, Jr.
 John Kolbucar
 John Mike Koutsos
 Leo Richard Leinwand, Jr.
 Cecil Burton Leonard
 George James Lewis
 Glen Gordon Lockwood
 Horace Paul Lytle
 Clifford Leroy Martin
 William Evorn McCulough, Jr.
 Harry Bland McLaughlin, Jr.
 Ernest Wade Miller
 Gilbert Lee Millhouse
 Peter Paul Milus
 Solomon Joseph Numair
 Michael Parry
 Melvin Lars Peterson
 George Anthony Pinter
 Frank Rudolph Pograis
 Robert Charles Reichelt
 Arthur Judson Rockwood
 Julius Rose
 James Guy Rymal
 Walter Robert Sadler
 Arvale Elvin Schlemmer
 Ernest Ferdinand Schramm
 Clifford Edward Sederstrand
 Eugene Felix Sieracki
 Robert Anton Simandl
 Donald Bruce Smith, Jr.
 George Sterling, Jr.
 Arthur Robert Stone
 John Clinton Strout, Jr.
 William Gene Stull
 Jess Elmer Sturdivan
 Emil Horace Sutherland
 Woodrow Wilson Swartzback
 Alfred Horatio Tarr
 Roland Norris Thompson
 Raymond Beverly Tinker
 Alexander Scammel Wadsworth, III, X.O.
 Raymond Robert Walz
 John Harris Wesley
 Joseph Stanley White
 Ernest Edward Whitney, Jr.
 Roy Edgar Williams
 Walter Joseph Winkle
 Homer Don Wright

See also 
 List of submarines of the United States Navy
 List of U.S. Navy losses in World War II

References

External links 
HBDB The Historical Marker DataBase
On Eternal Patrol: USS Golet
U.S.S. GOLET at the Historical Marker DataBase
USS GOLET at the Wisconsin Maritime Museum

Gato-class submarines
World War II submarines of the United States
Lost submarines of the United States
World War II shipwrecks in the Pacific Ocean
Ships built in Manitowoc, Wisconsin
1943 ships
Ships lost with all hands
Maritime incidents in June 1944
Submarines sunk by Japanese warships